Ramal da Lousã is a railway line which connects the stations of Coimbra-B, on the Linha do Norte, and Coimbra, in Portugal. It was opened by the Companhia Real dos Caminhos de Ferro Portugueses, under the name Ramal de Coimbra, on 18 October 1885, and was extended to Lousã on 16 December 1906, and to Serpins on 10  August 1930.

During the 1990s the Metro Mondego project was planned, with the intention of replacing the Ramal da Lousã with a light rail system. The section Miranda do Corvo–Serpins was closed on 1 December 2009, and the section Coimbra–Miranda do Corvo on 4 January 2010, with buses replacing the service. The section from Coimbra-B to Coimbra was not closed, making Coimbra the terminus again. The construction of the Metro Mondego started, but was stopped due to the 2010–14 Portuguese financial crisis. In 2017, the Portuguese government changed the plans for Metro Mondego, renaming it Sistema de Mobilidade do Mondego: instead of a light rail, it is to be a guided bus system. The line from Coimbra-B to Coimbra is due to close by the end of 2020, and the new system is planned to be operational in 2021.

See also
List of railway lines in Portugal
List of Portuguese locomotives and railcars
History of rail transport in Portugal

References

Sources

Lousa
Iberian gauge railways
Railway lines opened in 1885